Novgorodsky (masculine), Novgorodskaya (feminine), or Novgorodskoye (neuter) is the name of several rural localities in Russia:
Novgorodsky (rural locality), a settlement in Pesochensky Rural Administrative Okrug of Karachevsky District in Bryansk Oblast; 
Novgorodskoye, Kaliningrad Oblast, a settlement in Dobrinsky Rural Okrug of Guryevsky District in Kaliningrad Oblast
Novgorodskoye, Tula Oblast, a selo in Dvorikovsky Rural Okrug of Volovsky District in Tula Oblast
Novgorodskoye, Bezhetsky District, Tver Oblast, a village in Sukromenskoye Rural Settlement of Bezhetsky District in Tver Oblast
Novgorodskoye, Torzhoksky District, Tver Oblast, a village in Moshkovskoye Rural Settlement of Torzhoksky District in Tver Oblast
Novgorodskoye, Vladimir Oblast, a selo in Suzdalsky District of Vladimir Oblast
Novgorodskaya (rural locality), a village in Timoshinsky Selsoviet of Verkhnetoyemsky District in Arkhangelsk Oblast